Pomax is a genus of flowering plants in the coffee family, Rubiaceae. Pomax umbellata, found in Australia, is the sole species of the genus. The genus was created in 1830, by the Swiss taxonomist Augustin Pyramus de Candolle, and published in his Prodromus Systematis Naturalis Regni Vegetabilis. Pomax umbellata was first described as Opercularia umbellata by Joseph Gaertner in 1788. but was transferred to the genus, Pomax by Daniel Solander in 1834.

References

External links 

 Pomax umbellata occurrence data from the Australasian Virtual Herbarium

Monotypic Rubiaceae genera
Flora of Australia
Plants described in 1830
Plants described in 1788
Taxa named by Joseph Gaertner
Anthospermeae